Inner Journey Out is the fifth studio album by American rock band Psychic Ills. It was released on June 3, 2016, by Sacred Bones Records.

Critical reception

At Metacritic, which assigns a normalized rating out of 100 to reviews from mainstream critics, the album has an average score of 70 based on 8 reviews, indicating "generally favorable reviews".

Track listing

References

2016 albums
Psychic Ills albums
Sacred Bones Records albums